Gustav Arne Carlsson (born 5 January 1943) is a Swedish former ice hockey defenceman.

Carlsson competed at the 1968 Winter Olympics in Grenoble, France. He previously played for Södertälje SK, Frölunda HC, and Almtuna IS in the Swedish Elite League.

References

1943 births
Ice hockey players at the 1968 Winter Olympics
Living people
Olympic ice hockey players of Sweden
Sportspeople from Uppsala
Swedish ice hockey defencemen